KLUB (106.9 FM, "KLUB Tejano 106.9") is a radio station serving the Victoria, Texas, area. It is under ownership of Townsquare Media. It was previously known as "KLUB Classic Rock 106.9", until 12:00 CST, Tuesday, January 11, 2022, with a classic rock format. It now broadcasts with a Tejano format since its rebranding.

References

External links
Tejano 106.9 - Official website

LUB
Radio stations established in 1995
Townsquare Media radio stations
Tejano music